Alvik is a locality situated in Leksand Municipality, Dalarna County, Sweden with 227 inhabitants in 2010.

References 

Populated places in Dalarna County
Populated places in Leksand Municipality